Fleischer (or Fleisher) is a common German and Yiddish family name. Its literal meaning is "butcher". Other German family names with the same meaning include Metzger, Mezger, Fleischman, and Fleischmann.

People 
 Amy Fleischer, American mechanical engineer
 Ari Fleischer (born 1960), White House press secretary from 2001 to 2003
 Bruce Fleisher (born 1948), American PGA golfer
 Carl Gustav Fleischer, Norwegian general and the first land commander to win a major victory against the Germans in World War II
 Charles Fleischer (born 1950), actor, stand-up comedian and voice artist
 Dave Fleischer, American animation film director and film producer
 Edytha Fleischer (1898–1957), German operatic soprano
 Gerd Fleischer (born 1942), Norwegian human rights activist
 Heinrich Leberecht Fleischer, German
 Lawrence Fleisher, American attorney and sports agent
 Leon Fleisher, American pianist and conductor
 Martin Fleisher, American bridge player
 Max Fleischer (1883–1972), American animator and film director
 Max Fleischer (painter) (1861–1930), German painter and botanist
 Michael Paul Fleischer, American businessman
 Michael Fleischer (mineralogist) (1908–1998), American chemist and mineralogist.
 Michael Fleisher, American writer
 Nat Fleischer, American boxing writer and collector
 Ofer Fleisher (born 1966), Israeli basketball player
 Rasmus Fleischer, Swedish
 Ruben Fleischer, American film director
 Richard Fleischer (1916–2006), American film director
 Samuel S. Fleisher (1871–1944), American manufacturer, art patron, and philanthropist
 Yishai Fleisher

Other
 Fleisher Center
 Fleischer Studios
 Fleisher Yarn
 Kayser–Fleischer ring

See also 
 Fleisch (disambiguation)

Occupational surnames
Surnames
German-language surnames
Jewish surnames